Matylda Kowal (née Szlęzak; born 11 January 1989 in Rzeszów) is a Polish middle- and long-distance runner. She competed in the 3000 metres steeplechase at the 2012 Summer Olympics, placing 41st with a time of 10:08.84. She competed at the 2016 Summer Olympics.

Competition record

Personal bests
1000 metres – 2:44.89 (Kraków 2011) 
1500 metres – 4:15.14 (Trier 2018)
3000 metres – 9:04.03 (Gothenburg 2018)
5000 metres – 16:13.86 (Bydgoszcz 2011)
3000 metres steeplechase – 9:35.13 (Rio de Janeiro 2016)

References

1989 births
Living people
Polish female steeplechase runners
Olympic athletes of Poland
Athletes (track and field) at the 2012 Summer Olympics
Athletes (track and field) at the 2016 Summer Olympics
People from Rzeszów
Sportspeople from Podkarpackie Voivodeship
Polish female middle-distance runners
Polish Athletics Championships winners
Competitors at the 2011 Summer Universiade
Competitors at the 2017 Summer Universiade
20th-century Polish women
21st-century Polish women